Brent Wilson (born 9 September 1981 in Napier, New Zealand) is a rugby union player for Nottingham in the Aviva Championship. He previously played for North Harbour in the ITM Cup and Newcastle Falcons in the Premiership. He primarily plays at flanker.

References

External links
Newcastle Falcons profile

1981 births
Living people
Rugby union players from Napier, New Zealand
Newcastle Falcons players
North Harbour rugby union players